Mohammad Mahbubuzzaman was a Bangladeshi bureaucrat, Cabinet Secretary, and government minister.

Early life 
Mahbubuzzaman was born on 25 November 1929 in Rajshahi, Rajshahi District, East Bengal, British India. He graduated from Rajshahi Loknath High School. He studied at Tejgaon Agriculture College and worked as the Superintendent of Dhaka Farms.

Career
In 1954, Mahbubuzzaman joined the Pakistan Civil Service. He served as the Sub-Divisional Officer of Nilphamari District. He served as the Deputy Commissioner of Rangpur District. He has served as the Registrar of the Department of Cooperatives.

Mahbubuzzaman is a former chairman of the Bangladesh Tea Board. He was the second person to become Secretary at the Ministry of Public Administration. He went on to become Secretary of the Ministry of Home Affairs. On 24 November 1986, he retired from the civil service.

Following the death of the member of parliament of Naogaon-3, Mohammad Baitullah, Mahbubuzzaman contested the following by-election and was elected to parliament.

Mahbubuzzaman was the cabinet secretary of during the government of General Hussain Mohammad Ershad. He joined the cabinet of Ershad after retiring from government service, as a minister. He served as the Minister of Agriculture from 1988 to 1990.

In 1990s, Mahbubuzzaman was the first chairman of Social Marketing Company and chairman of Aziz and Company. He was a member of Retired Government Employees Welfare Association and Bangladesh Medical Studies and Research Institute.

Personal life
Mahbubuzzaman has two sons. His eldest son, Colonel Mohammad Anisuzzaman, was the Bangladesh Rifles Mymensingh Sector Commander and his youngest son, Mohammad Ashrafuzzaman, lives in the United States is a vice president of Bank of America in New York City. Colonel Mohammad Anisuzzaman was killed in the 2009 Bangladesh Rifles Mutiny.

Death
Mahbubuzzaman died on 3 March 2008. He was buried in Banani military graveyard. In 2009, Prime Minister Sheikh Hasina awarded him Krishibid award posthumously.  A nighborhood of his village was named after him and Sapahar Zaman Nagar Girls High School was founded after his name.

References

Jatiya Party politicians
Agriculture ministers of Bangladesh
2008 deaths
3rd Jatiya Sangsad members
1929 births
People from Rajshahi District